Raini is a village in Chamoli district in Uttarakhand, north India. Rini is located on the river banks at the confluence of Rishi Ganga and Dhauli Ganga rivers.

Location 
Rini is on the southern embankment of the Rishi Ganga and Dhauli Ganga gorge, directly at the northwestern edge of Nanda Devi National Park. Traffic connection is via the Joshimath-Malari Road, next localities are Tapovan to the west and Lata to the east.

History 
The 1973 Chipko movement for forest conservation started in Rini.

On 7 February 2021, Rini was severely struck during the 2021 Uttarakhand flood. The flood supposedly emerged from or near Nanda Devi glacier and ran downstream the Rishi Ganga gorge, destroying the Rishi Ganga Dam and power plant, before hitting the village.

A report by the Uttarakhand Disaster Recovery Initiative subsequently advised for the village to be rehabilitated due to "serious slope stability problems".

Famous residents 

 Gaura Devi

See also 
 Joshimath, next largest city, downstream Dhauli Ganga
 Tapovan Vishnugad Hydropower Plant
 Dhauliganga Dam

External links 
 Node: Reni (7833070518)

References 

Cities and towns in Chamoli district